The Heil- und Giftpflanzengarten der Tierärztlichen Hochschule Hannover (5000 m2) is a botanical garden specializing in medicinal and poisonous plants. It is maintained by the Tierärztlichen Hochschule Hannover (University of Veterinary Medicine Hanover), and located on campus at Bünteweg 17D, Hanover, Lower Saxony, Germany.

The garden contains over 300 taxa of medicinal and poisonous plants, with nearly 100 information displays describing their appearance, preparation, and effects. It is divided into a medical section, veterinary medical section, and section of poisonous plants.

See also 
 List of botanical gardens in Germany

External links 
 Tierärztlichen Hochschule Hannover
 Hermann von Helmholtz-Zentrum entry
 BGCI entry

Hannover, Heil- und Giftpflanzengarten der Tierarztlichen Hochschule
Hannover, Heil- und Giftpflanzengarten der Tierarztlichen Hochschule
Geography of Hanover